Gonçalo Martins de Abreu or Geoffrey Devereux (11th-century) was an Anglo-Norman Knight, who arrived in the Iberian Peninsula with Henry, Count of Portugal.

Biography 

Gonçalo was the son of William d'Évreux by a second unnamed wife. He was the founder of the Abreu Family in Portugal. After establishing his residence in Galicia, Martins Évreux modified his surname to Abreu.

References 

11th-century French people
Anglo-Normans
Medieval Portuguese nobility
Portuguese Roman Catholics
Norman warriors
11th-century Portuguese people